Commodore Eric Eugene Johnston  (29 July 1933 – 26 February 1997) was a Royal Australian Navy officer and the Administrator of the Northern Territory from 1 January 1981 to 1 July 1989.

Career
During his naval career he commanded  in the Vietnam War. Later he commanded  from 1976 to 1978.

After Cyclone Tracy in 1974, as Naval Officer Commanding Northern Australia, he was involved in the administration of emergency naval assistance.

Recognition and honours
He was appointed an Officer of the Order of the British Empire in 1970, and an Officer of the Order of Australia in 1988.

The Eric Johnston Lectures of the Northern Territory Library were named in his honour. He gave the first lecture in 1986.

References

External links
Archive of Speeches and documents as Administrator

1933 births
1997 deaths
Administrators of the Northern Territory
Australian military personnel of the Indonesia–Malaysia confrontation
Australian military personnel of the Vietnam War
Australian Officers of the Order of the British Empire
Officers of the Order of Australia
People from the Northern Territory
Royal Australian Navy officers